Darreh Deraz (also Romanized as Darreh Derāz) is a village in Azna Rural District, in the Central District of Khorramabad County, Lorestan Province, Iran. At the 2006 census, its population was 63, which consisted of 14 families.

References 

Towns and villages in Khorramabad County